Cinecom can refer to:

Cinecom, a video production company based in Belgium
Cinecom Pictures, a former American independent film company